Robert Dickson Orrock, Sr. is an American politician. Since 1990, he has been a member of the Virginia House of Delegates, representing the 54th district in the east-central part of the state, including (since 2002) parts of Caroline and Spotsylvania counties; the former county is included in the Greater Richmond Region and the latter county is included in the Washington metropolitan area. From 1990–1991, the District encompassed all of Spotsylvania County, part of Caroline County, and part of the Fredericksburg City. From 1992–2001, the District encompassed part of Spotsylvania County and all of Fredericksburg City. He is a member of the Republican Party.

Early life and education
Orrock was born in Fredericksburg, Virginia. He attended Ladysmith High School in Caroline County, graduating in 1974. After one year at Germanna Community College, he transferred to Virginia Tech, receiving a B.S. degree in agriculture education in 1978. He received an M.Ed. degree in the same subject from Virginia State University in 1988.

Career
Orrock is a semi-retired teacher of agricultural education at Spotsylvania High School. In 2017, the widower remarried to Debra Orrock, née Shelton. Since 1973, Delegate Orrock has served on the Ladysmith, Virginia Volunteer Rescue Squad and has since gone on to become a trustee of both the Ladysmith and Spotsylvania County, Virginia Volunteer Rescue Squad. Orrock is also a certified hunter safety instructor with the Virginia Department of Game and Inland Fisheries. He is also a longtime part-time emcee of a Sunday morning radio gospel show on WFLS-FM broadcasting from Fredericksburg, Virginia.

Positions and appointments
Orrock served as the Co-Chairman of the Agriculture Committee (2000–2001) and has been the Chairman of the Health, Welfare, and Institutions Committee continually since 2010.

He has served as a member on the following committees since joining the House of Delegates:
Agriculture (1990–1993 and 1995–2001)
Chesapeake and Its Tributaries (1990–1994)
Agriculture, Chesapeake, and Natural Resources (2002–)
Health, Welfare, and Institutions (1990–2003 and 2006–)
Counties, Cities, and Towns (1994–2009)
Finance (1998–2005 and 2010–)
Mining and Mineral Resources (2000–2001)
Rules (2012–)

Electoral history

Notes

External links
 (campaign finance)

Living people
Republican Party members of the Virginia House of Delegates
Virginia Tech alumni
Virginia State University alumni
People from Caroline County, Virginia
Politicians from Fredericksburg, Virginia
21st-century American politicians
Year of birth missing (living people)